Ariez Elyaas Deen Heshaam (born 24 December 1993) is a Malaysian former professional tennis player.

Elyaas, the son of former national tennis head coach Deen Heshaam, comes from Kuching on the island of Borneo and was a member of the Malaysia Davis Cup team from 2010 to 2015, debuting as a 16-year old. He appeared in a total of 15 ties, for wins in four singles rubbers.

On the ATP Tour, Elyaas featured in his only singles main draw at the 2012 Proton Malaysian Open, held in Kuala Lumpur. Competing as a wildcard, he was beaten in the first round by Igor Sijsling.

Elyaas's career included a stint playing U.S. collegiate tennis for the University of the Cumberlands.

In 2015 he won a team bronze medal for Malaysia at the Southeast Asian Games in Singapore.

References

External links
 
 
 
 

1993 births
Living people
Malaysian male tennis players
People from Kuching
University of the Cumberlands alumni
Competitors at the 2015 Southeast Asian Games
Southeast Asian Games medalists in tennis
Southeast Asian Games bronze medalists for Malaysia
Competitors at the 2009 Southeast Asian Games
College men's tennis players in the United States
21st-century Malaysian people